Ahmadabad (also Romanized as Aḩmadābād; also known as Aḩmadābād Anār) is a village in Hoseynabad Rural District, in the Central District of Anar County, Kerman Province, Iran. At the 2006 census, its population was 291, in 81 families.

References 

Populated places in Anar County